Opinion polling (locally known as "surveys") for the 2013 Philippine Senate election is carried out by two major polling firms: Social Weather Stations (SWS), and Pulse Asia, with a handful of minor polling firms. A typical poll asks a voter to name twelve persons one would vote for in the senate election. The SWS and Pulse Asia's surveys are usually national in scope, while other polling firms usually restrict their samples within Metro Manila.

Candidates

There two major coalitions in this election: Team PNoy (known as the LP-Akbayan-NPC-NP-LDP Coalition until January 27, 2013), and the United Nationalist Alliance (UNA). The two coalitions used to share three common candidates, until UNA dropped them. A third coalition, the Makabayang Koalisyon ng Mamamayan (Makabayan; Patriotic Coalition of the People) share four candidates from Team PNoy. A further two more parties put up ticket of three candidates each, two parties had a ticket made up of one candidate each, and three candidates are independents that are not a part of any ticket.

These are aside from the parties that put up candidates, and may belong to any coalition. In the tables below, the colors refer to the parties, unless otherwise stated in the seat totals sections.
Key: Green tick: regular candidate, yellow tick: guest candidate.
Note:
Francis Escudero, Loren Legarda and Grace Poe were included as guest candidates of UNA until they were dropped from the ticket on February 21. Polls that are taken before that date includes the three as part of the UNA ticket in the tables below; those that are after on or after the date excludes them from the UNA tallies.

Voting preferences per candidate

Key dates:
Period of submission of certificates of candidacies: October 1 to 5, 2012
Start of campaign period for Senate candidates: February 12, 2013
Start of campaign period for local candidates: March 29, 2013 (Due to that date being a Good Friday, campaigning officially starts on March 30.)
News blackout on election surveys for the Senate election: April 28–May 12, 2013
Election day: May 13, 2013

Until filing of certificates of candidacy

Until the campaign period for the Senate election

Until the campaign period for local elections

Until election day

Rankings

Polls administered after October 2010, the deadline for the filing of certificates of candidacies.
The rankings below are from the pollsters that published them. The pollsters may or may not consider "statistical ties", or candidates whose voting preferences' margins are within the margin of error .

Graph

The result of each candidate's opinion poll (survey) result is denoted by a plot point, or a "period" (per.). The lines denote moving averages (mov. avg.) of the last three polls (each poll given equal weight) for each candidate; as pollsters may use different methodologies, it is invalid to plot each period from all pollsters as if it is a single series. Hence, a moving average is used to link all polls from all pollsters into one series. Some candidates may not appear on some polls, and these do not include candidates who are not on the final list but were included in other polls. The twelfth ranking candidate in each poll is denoted by a line, for easy reference.

Seats won
The first figure denotes the number of candidates from the party or coalition that made it to the top 12 in each survey; the figures inside the parenthesis are other candidates that made it within the margin of error. The figure of the party or coalition (except independents) the most seats is highlighted; those that outright win a majority of seats contested (7, if 12 seats will be contested) is italicized, while the party or coalition that outright wins a majority of seats in the Senate (13) is boldfaced.

Some of the totals might not add up as most slates have shared candidates.

Before the filing of certificates of candidacy

After the filing of certificates of candidacy
Polls administered after October 5, 2010, the deadline for the filing of certificates of candidacies.

Composition of the Senate
The first figure denotes the number of candidates from the party or coalition that made it to the top 12 in each survey; the figures inside the parenthesis are other candidates that made it within the margin of error. The figure of the party or coalition (except independents) that has the most seats is highlighted; those that outright wins a majority of seats in the Senate (13) is boldfaced.

These are polls administered after October 5, 2010, the deadline for the filing of certificates of candidacies.

Overview
Key:
 ‡ Seats up
 ‡^ Vacant seat up
 * Gained by a party from another party
 √ Held by the incumbent
 + Held by the same party with a new senator

Polls

References

2013 Philippine general election
2013
Philippines